Daniel Rueckert (born January 1969) is Professor of Visual Information Processing and former Head of the Department of Computing at Imperial College London.

He received a Diploma in Computer Science from the Technical University of Berlin and a PhD in Computer Science from Imperial College London entitled Segmentation and tracking in cardiovascular images using geometrically deformable models and templates. 

He is a Fellow of the Royal Academy of Engineering, a Fellow of the Institute of Electrical and Electronics Engineers (IEEE), and a Fellow of the Academy of Medical Sciences. 

He has an h-index of 111.

References 

1969 births
Living people
Technical University of Berlin alumni
Alumni of Imperial College London
Academics of Imperial College London
Fellows of the Royal Academy of Engineering
Fellow Members of the IEEE
Fellows of the Academy of Medical Sciences (United Kingdom)